Chasing Eagle Rock is a 2015 film directed by Erick Avari and starring Michael Welch, Erick Avari, Rafael Morais, Edgar Morais, and Robert Cicchini.

Cast
 Michael Welch as J.R.
 Erick Avari as Cam Avery
 Mary-Margaret Humes as Mags Avery
 Robert Cicchini as Joe Paul
 Beth Behrs as Deborah
 Lauren Tom as Roxanne
 Edgar Morais as Jaffa
 Rafael Morais as Raffa
 Ashley Gardner

External links

2015 films
American crime drama films
2010s English-language films
2010s American films